Dyer Daniel Lum (February 15, 1839 – April 6, 1893) was an American anarchist, labor activist and poet. A leading syndicalist and a prominent left-wing intellectual of the 1880s, Lum is best remembered as the lover and mentor of early anarcha-feminist Voltairine de Cleyre.

Lum was a prolific writer who authored a number of key anarchist texts and contributed to publications including Mother Earth, Twentieth Century, Liberty (Benjamin Tucker's individualist anarchist journal), The Alarm (the journal of the International Working People's Association) and The Open Court, among others. Following the arrest of Albert Parsons, Lum edited The Alarm from 1892 to 1893.

Traditionally portrayed as a "genteel, theoretical anarchist", Lum has recently been recast by the scholarship of Paul Avrich as an "uncompromising rebel thirsty for violence and martyrdom" in light of his involvement in the Haymarket affair in 1886.

Life

Lum was a descendant of the prominent New England Tappan family as his grandfather was an American revolutionary. In hopes of bringing about the end of slavery, he volunteered to fight for the Union Army in the American Civil War. He served as an adjutant in the Fourteenth New York Cavalry and later as a brevet captain, seeing combat in the Red River Campaign. A bookbinder by trade, Lum became active in the American labor movement in the aftermath of the war. He served as a secretary to Samuel Gompers and ran for lieutenant governor of Massachusetts on the Labor Reform ticket of abolitionist Wendell Phillips in 1870.

Lum became widely known in 1877 after a period traveling across the country as secretary to a congressional committee appointed to "inquire into the depression of labor". Between 1880 and 1892, he was an advocate of direct action and trade unionism and in later years was "the moving spirit of the American group" which worked for the commutation of Alexander Berkman's sentence for the latter's attempted assassination of Henry Clay Frick.

Relationship with Voltairine de Cleyre
When Lum met Voltairine de Cleyre in 1888, he was twenty-seven years her elder and had lived a life rich in experience. They forged an "unshakable" friendship and Lum had a profound influence on de Cleyre's political development which evolved in an opposite direction to his as she started out as an orthodox Tuckerite individualist anarchist, but became increasingly involved with the radical labor movement and ultimately called for a panarchist anarchism without adjectives movement. Their relationship ended after five years of intense involvement, leaving their planned collaborative project—a lengthy social and philosophical anarchist novel—ultimately unpublished.

Involvement in the Haymarket affair
Lum was closely associated with and worked alongside those involved in the Haymarket affair in Chicago in 1886. In an 1891 essay, he wrote that August Spies sent word to the militants on the afternoon of May 4 that they were not to bring arms to the Haymarket. This order was not respected, Lum noted, as "one man disobeyed that order; always self-determined, he acted upon his own responsibility, preferring to be prepared for resistance to onslaught rather than to quietly imitate the spiritual "lamb led to slaughter". Lum asserted that the eight defendants were initially unaware of the bomb-thrower's identity, although it became known to two of them ("but neither Spies nor Parsons"), believed by Paul Avrich to be George Engel and Adolph Fischer.

In Lum's account, the bomb-thrower's name "was never mentioned in the trial and is today unknown to the public". Paul Avrich attests that Lum urged Albert Parsons to refuse clemency and plotted to rescue the anarchists from Cook County Jail by attacking it with explosives. According to de Cleyre, he then assisted the suicide of Louis Lingg (one of the eight defendants) by smuggling into Lingg's prison cell a dynamite cap concealed in a cigar which Lingg subsequently lit, thereby blowing off half his face and leaving himself lingering for several hours in torturous pain before dying.

Death
Lum committed suicide in 1893 after suffering from severe depression, although at the time the cause of death was reported in the anarchist press as "fatty degeneration of the heart".

Philosophy

Lum's political philosophy was a fusion of individualist anarchist economics, "a radicalized form of laissez-faire economics" inspired by the Boston anarchists, with radical labor organization similar to that of the Chicago anarchists of the time. Lum's ideas have variously been described as individualist anarchist, syndicalist, mutualist and anarcho-communist as well as anarchist without adjectives. Herbert Spencer and Pierre-Joseph Proudhon influenced Lum strongly in his individualist tendency. He developed a mutualist theory of unions and as such was active within the Knights of Labor and later promoted anti-political strategies in the American Federation of Labor. Frustration with abolitionism, spiritualism and labor reform caused Lum to embrace anarchism and radicalize workers as he came to believe that revolution would inevitably involve a violent struggle between the working class and the employing class. Convinced of the necessity of violence to enact social change, he volunteered to fight in the American Civil War, hoping thereby to bring about the end of slavery. Kevin Carson has praised Lum's fusion of individualist laissez-faire economics with radical labor activism as "creative" and described him as "more significant than any in the Boston group".

Lum argued in The Economics of Anarchy that the labor problem was a result of intervention by the state in creating monopolies, particularly the "land monopoly" of land titles and the "money monopoly" of a constrained money supply. Lum advocated the destruction of the land monopoly which he saw as a government-granted monopoly by abolishing land titles and to allow free access to land, thus making the extraction of rent impossible. Similarly, mutual banks set up to issue their own currencies would end the state monopoly and undercut the ability of banks and lenders to charge interest. His thoughts could be summarized as such:

Bibliography
 Utah and Its People: Facts and Statistics Bearing on the "Mormon Problem" (1882). A defense of the Mormons and a plea for tolerance of polygamy.
 
 Spiritual Delusions (1873). A further treatment of Mormonism.
 The Economics of Anarchy: A Study of the Industrial Type (1890).
 Philosophy of Trade-Unionism (1892).

Selected articles
 "Dyer D. Lum on Anarchy". Published in The Alarm and in Albert Parsons' Anarchism: Its Philosophy and Scientific Basis.
 "Eighteen Christian Centuries or the Evolution of the Gospel of Anarchy" (PDF). It was syndicated in Liberty.
 "The Status of the Scab" (1890). Published in Rights of Labor, it was later heavily critiqued by Victor Yarros in Liberty.

See also
 Anarchism in the United States
 Voltairine de Cleyre
 Joseph Labadie
 Albert Parsons
 Benjamin Tucker

Footnotes

Further reading
 Brooks, Frank H. (1988). Anarchism, revolution, and labor in the thought of Dyer D. Lum. .

External links

 
 Anarchist Library page

1839 births
1893 deaths
1890s suicides
American anarchists
American anti-capitalists
American male non-fiction writers
American male poets
American political writers
American syndicalists
Anarchist writers
Individualist anarchists
American trade union leaders
Libertarian socialists
Mutualists
Suicide bombers
Suicides in Massachusetts